Vedeseta is a comune (municipality) in the Province of Bergamo in the Italian region of Lombardy, located about  northeast of Milan and about  northwest of Bergamo.

Vedeseta borders the following municipalities: Barzio, Brumano, Cassiglio, Fuipiano Valle Imagna, Moggio, Morterone, Taleggio, Valtorta.

Demographic evolution

References